Gerard Leslie Hand (born 30 June 1942) is a former Australian politician, who was a Labor member of the Australian House of Representatives, representing the seat of Melbourne. He was Minister for Aboriginal and Torres Strait Islander Affairs in the Third Hawke Ministry, and Minister for Immigration, Local Government and Ethnic Affairs in the Fourth Hawke Ministry and First Keating Ministry.

Minister for Aboriginal Affairs
As Minister for Aboriginal Affairs, Hand notably clashed with the Secretary of the Department of Aboriginal Affairs, outspoken Aboriginal activist Charles Perkins, and Perkins resigned from the department in 1988 after being accused of misadministration.

Minister for Immigration, Local Government and Ethnic Affairs
Gerry Hand was the immigration minister who, in 1992, introduced the controversial policy of mandatory detention for illegal arrivals and asylum seekers.

I believe it is crucial that all persons who come to Australia without prior authorisation not be released into the community. Their release would undermine the Government's strategy for determining their refugee claims or entry claims. Indeed, I believe it is vital to Australia that this be prevented as far as possible. The Government is determined that a clear signal be sent that migration to Australia may not be achieved by simply arriving in this country and expecting to be allowed into the community.

Since retiring from politics in 1993, Hand has represented Australia before the United Nations High Commission for Refugees and a round table discussion on refugees organised by the Government of Thailand. He is also a member of the Immigration Detention Advisory Group, providing advice to the Minister for Immigration and Citizenship on the  services, accommodation and amenities at the immigration detention centres.

In 1995, the Deputy Leader of the Government in the Senate, Senator Robert Ray suggested Hand as a possible replacement to Barry Jones as President of the ALP but this suggestion never eventuated.

References

1942 births
Living people
Australian Labor Party members of the Parliament of Australia
Members of the Australian House of Representatives for Melbourne
Members of the Australian House of Representatives
20th-century Australian politicians